Death Party is an EP by American rock band The Gun Club, released in 1983. It is the only official release of the Jim Duckworth and Dee Pop line up of the band which existed for about eight months. 

A scheduled recording session for Tex & the Horseheads, the band Jeffrey Lee Pierce had put together around his girlfriend Linda/Texacala Jones was going to go unused. So the Gun Club filled the booking and recorded the Death Party EP with a bassist called Jimmy Joe Uliana who was a friend of Dee Pop's. Patricia Morrison was the Gun Club's bassist at the time, but didn't play on the EP because of the recording session's spur of the moment nature.

Death Party was produced by Chris Stein, although he came to the sessions after most of the recordings were completed.

Track listing

Personnel
The Gun Club
Jeffrey Lee Pierce - vocals, piano, guitar; bass on "The Lie"
Jim Duckworth - lead guitar
Dee Pop (Dimitri C. Papadopoulos) - drums, percussion
with:
"Texas" Linda Jones (Texacala Jones) - backing vocals and "screams"
Jimmy Joe Uliana - bass except on "The Lie"
Technical
Joe Arlotta - session engineer
Robin Young, Clayton Clark - cover artwork

References

External links

The Gun Club albums
1983 EPs
Cooking Vinyl EPs